The Alexander String Quartet is a string quartet based in San Francisco. Formed in New York in 1981, the Alexander String Quartet has since 1989 been Ensemble in Residence of San Francisco Performances and directors of the Morrison Chamber Music Center in the College of Liberal and Creative Arts at San Francisco State University.

In 1982, the Alexander String Quartet was the first string quartet to win the Concert Artists Guild competition. In 1985, the Alexander String Quartet was the first American string quartet to win the Portsmouth International String Quartet Competition (now the Wigmore Hall International String Quartet Competition), winning both the audience prize and the jury's highest prize.

Members
Zakarias Grafilo, first violin
Frederick Lifsitz, second violin
David Samuel,  viola
Sandy Wilson, cello
—
Paul Yarbrough, viola (emeritus, co-founder)

See also
List of string quartet ensembles

References

External links
Alexander String Quartet official website.
Artists' page on BesenArts.
Artists' page on San Francisco State University.
Artists' page on San Francisco Performances.
Artists' page on Baruch College.

Musical groups established in 1981
American string quartets